Keaau (also written as Keaau) is a census-designated place (CDP) in Hawaii County, Hawaii. located in the District of Puna. The population was 1,195 at the time of the 2020 census. The population decreased by 12.1% from 2,253 at the time of the 2010 census.

History

Keaau was called ‘Ōla‘a and in 1899, the Olaa Sugar Company leased about 4,000 acres of land,  for growing sugarcane.

Geography
Keaau is on the east side of the island of Hawaii at  (19.621072, -155.041706). It is bordered to the southwest by Kurtistown. The junction of Hawaii Route 11 (the Hawaii Belt Road) and Hawaii Route 130 (Keaau-Pahoa Road) is in the northern part of the community.

The Board on Geographic Names officially designated the populated place as Keaau in 2003.

Demographics

2010 Census data
At the 2010 census there were 2,253 people in 701 households residing in the CDP. The racial makeup of the CDP was 12.38% White, 0.22% African American, 0.18% American Indian & Alaska Native, 52.02% Asian, 7.50% Native Hawaiian & Pacific Islander, 0.44% from other races, and 27.25% from two or more races. Hispanic or Latino of any race were 8.74%.

Of the 701 households, 28.0% had children under the age of 18 living with them. The average household size was 3.21.

In the Keaau CDP the population was spread out, with 23.7% under the age of 18, 9.5% from 18 to 24, 9.6% from 25 to 34, 19.6 from 35 to 49, 20.4% from 50 to 64, and 17.2% 65 or older. For every 100 females, there were 99.6 males. For every 100 males there were 100.4 females.

The median household income was $39,722 and the median family income in 2000 was $43,347. Males had a median income in 2000 of $27,344 versus $23,287 for females. The per capita income for the CDP in 2000 was $14,657. About 9.6% of families and 12.3% of the population were below the poverty line in 2000, including 14.9% of those under age 18 and 9.0% of those age 65 or over.

Points of interest
 Hiiaka's Healing Herb Garden
 Mauna Loa Macadamia Nut Corporation visitors center between Hilo and Keaau

References

External links
 

Census-designated places in Hawaii County, Hawaii
Populated places on Hawaii (island)